Mohammed Ghadir (born 21 January 1991) is an Israeli professional footballer who plays for Hapoel Hadera.

Club career

Maccabi Haifa
After progressing through the youth ranks of Maccabi Haifa, Ghadir made his first team debut for Haifa on 31 May 2008 against F.C. Ashdod, playing 88 minutes in Haifa's 2–0 loss. Ghadir scored his first club goal against Hapoel Petah Tikva on 22 November by opening the scoring in Haifa's 4–1 win. Ghadir played in the UEFA Champions League with Maccabi Haifa during the 2009–10 season.

International career
A promising junior, Ghadir is a member of the Israel under-21 team after playing through the under-17 and under-19 ranks of the national team. He made his debut for the Israel under-21 team on 19 November 2008 against the Serbia under-21 team at Ramat Gan Stadium in his side's 3–2 loss. Ghadir scored in the game, just minutes after coming on as a substitute after half-time.

Honours

Club
Maccabi Haifa
Israeli Premier League (2): 2008–09, 2010–11

Hapoel Be'er Sheva
Israeli Premier League (2): 2015–16, 2016-17
Israel Super Cup (1): 2016
Toto Cup (1): 2016-17

References

External links
Mohammad Ghadir at Maccabi Haifa  
Mohammad Ghadir at Maccabi Haifa 
Mohammad Ghadir – Israel Football Association national team player details 

1991 births
Living people
Israeli footballers
Arab-Israeli footballers
Arab citizens of Israel
Bedouin Israelis
Israeli Muslims
Maccabi Haifa F.C. players
S.K. Beveren players
Bnei Sakhnin F.C. players
K.S.C. Lokeren Oost-Vlaanderen players
Hapoel Be'er Sheva F.C. players
Bnei Yehuda Tel Aviv F.C. players
Hapoel Hadera F.C. players
Israeli expatriate footballers
Expatriate footballers in Belgium
Israeli expatriate sportspeople in Belgium
Israeli Premier League players
Belgian Pro League players
Israel under-21 international footballers
Footballers from Northern District (Israel)
Association football forwards